Itaituba II National Forest is a national forest in the state of Pará, Brazil.

Location

The Itaituba II National Forest is in the Amazon biome.
It covers parts of the municipalities of Itaituba and Trairão in the state of Pará.
The Itaituba I and Itaituba II National Forests together cover .

History

The Itaituba II National Forest was created by decree nº 2.482 of 2 February 1998.
It is administered by the Chico Mendes Institute for Biodiversity Conservation (ICMBio).
It is classed as IUCN protected area category VI (protected area with sustainable use of natural resources) with the objective of sustainable multiple use of forest resources and scientific research, with emphasis on methods for sustainable exploitation of native forests.

Law 12678 of 25 June 2012 amended the limits of the Amazônia, Campos Amazônicos and Mapinguari national parks, the Itaituba I, Itaituba II and Crepori national forests and the Tapajós Environmental Protection Area.
All were reduced in size except the Campos Amazônicos.
The area removed from the Itaituba II National Forest corresponded to the proposed Sawré Muybu Indigenous Territory, and would be partly flooded by the proposed São Luiz do Tapajós Dam on the Tapajós.
Removing the area from the national forest removed an obstacle to the proposed dam.

Conservation

The national forest is in a region that contains 12 sustainable use conservation areas and 6 fully protected areas.
The fully protected areas, which cover , are the Amazônia, Jamanxim, Rio Novo and Serra do Pardo national parks, the Nascentes da Serra do Cachimbo Biological Reserve and the Terra do Meio Ecological Station.
The proposed South Amazon Ecological Corridor would link the conservation unit to other protected areas and indigenous territories in the region.

Notes

Sources

1998 establishments in Brazil
National forests of Brazil
Protected areas of Pará